Oxathiane is a saturated heterocyclic compound containing one oxygen, one sulfur and four carbon atoms in a ring. The formula is C4H8OS. There are three isomers:

1,2-Oxathiane or o-Oxathiane
1,3-Oxathiane or m-Oxathiane
1,4-Oxathiane or p-Oxathiane the most important